Dieren is a railway station located in Dieren, Netherlands. The station was opened on 2 February 1865 and is located on the Arnhem–Leeuwarden railway. Until 1976, the official name was Dieren-Doesburg. The train services are operated by Nederlandse Spoorwegen. Behind the station there is a steam railway that runs from Dieren to Apeldoorn via Beekbergen operated by the Veluwsche Stoomtrein Maatschappij over the old passenger line to Apeldoorn (opened in 1887, closed in 1950).

Train services

Bus services

External links

NS website 
Dutch Public Transport journey planner 

Railway stations in Gelderland
Railway stations opened in 1865
Railway stations on the Staatslijn A
Railway stations on the IJssellijn
Rheden
1865 establishments in the Netherlands
Railway stations in the Netherlands opened in the 19th century